Andy Murray won the men's singles title at the 2011 Cincinnati Masters after Novak Djokovic retired from the final, with the scoreline at 6–4, 3–0. It was Murray's seventh Masters title. Djokovic's retirement in the final marked only his second defeat of the season.

Roger Federer was the two-time defending champion, but lost to Tomáš Berdych in the quarterfinals.

Seeds
The top eight seeds receive a bye into the second round.

Qualifying

Main draw

Finals

Top half

Section 1

Section 2

Bottom half

Section 3

Section 4

References
Main draw

Western and Southern Open
2011 Western & Southern Open